The Western Lakes Activities Association was an athletic conference for high schools located in western Wayne and southern Oakland Counties in Michigan from 1982 through 2007.  The twelve schools of the WLAA merged with the Kensington Valley Conference, schools from the Oakland Activities Association, and newly opening schools to form the Kensington Lakes Activities Association in 2008.

History

The WLAA was formed in 1982 from the merger of the Western Six Activities Association and the Inter-Lakes League, with two schools from the Suburban Eight League.  The Western Six had lost Waterford Mott to the Greater Oakland Activities Association after 1980, while the Inter-Lakes League lost White Lake Lakeland to the Kensington Valley Conference, and Pontiac Northern did not field a team for 1981, leaving the ILL with four teams.  Livonia Bentley and Plymouth-Salem came from the Suburban Eight to align themselves with more local rivals, including Livonia Churchill, Livonia Stevenson, and Plymouth-Canton.  The extant school from the ILL, Waterford High School, joined Waterford Mott in the Greater Oakland conference before closing in 1983.

The initial roster of 10 schools was divided into two divisions, the Western and Lakes Divisions, and remained the same until 1985, when Livonia Bentley closed, and three schools joined from the Northwest Suburban League.  The 1985 alignment remained the same through the 2001-02 school year.

In 2002, Farmington, North Farmington, and Harrison left for the Oakland Activities Association, and Wayne Memorial joined.  In 2004, Walled Lake Northern and Plymouth joined the conference, bringing the WLAA to 12 teams for the remainder of its existence.

Divisional Alignments

1982-1984
Western Division
Farmington Harrison Hawks (from Western Six)
Livonia Churchill Chargers (from Western Six)
Northville Mustangs (from Western Six)
Plymouth-Canton Chiefs (from Western Six)
Walled Lake Western Warriors (from Western Six)

Lakes Division
Farmington Falcons (from Inter-Lakes)
Livonia Bentley Bulldogs (from Suburban Eight)
Livonia Stevenson Spartans (from Inter-Lakes)
Plymouth-Salem Rocks (from Suburban Eight)
Walled Lake Central Vikings (from Inter-Lakes)

1985-2001
Western Division
Farmington Harrison Hawks
Livonia Churchill Chargers
Livonia Franklin Patriots
Northville Mustangs
Plymouth-Canton Chiefs
Walled Lake Western Warriors

Lakes Division
Farmington Falcons
Livonia Stevenson Spartans
North Farmington Raiders
Plymouth-Salem Rocks
Walled Lake Central Vikings
Westland John Glenn Rockets

Changes from 1984:
Livonia Franklin, North Farmington, and Westland John Glenn join from the Northwest Suburban League
Livonia Bentley closes

2002-2003
Western Division
Canton Chiefs
Livonia Churchill Chargers
Livonia Franklin Patriots
Northville Mustangs
Walled Lake Western Warriors

Lakes Division
Livonia Stevenson Spartans
Salem Rocks
Walled Lake Central Vikings
Wayne Memorial Zebras 
Westland John Glenn Rockets

Changes from 2001:
Farmington, North Farmington and Harrison leave and join the Oakland Activities Association
Wayne Memorial joins from the Michigan Mega Conference
Plymouth-Salem and Plymouth-Canton drop "Plymouth" from their names with the opening of the new Plymouth High School

2004-2007
Western Division
Canton Chiefs
Livonia Churchill Chargers
Livonia Franklin Patriots
Northville Mustangs
Plymouth Wildcats
Walled Lake Western Warriors

Lakes Division
Livonia Stevenson Spartans
Salem Rocks
Walled Lake Central Vikings
Walled Lake Northern Knights
Wayne Memorial Zebras 
Westland John Glenn Rockets

Changes from 2003:
Plymouth and Walled Lake Northern began play in 2004

References

http://michigan-football.com/ - Michigan High School Football - conference records from 1950-present

Michigan high school sports conferences